The 1986 Pilkington Glass Championships was a women's tennis tournament played on grass courts at the Devonshire Park Lawn Tennis Club in Eastbourne, United Kingdom and was part of the 1986 WTA Tour. It was the 12th edition of the tournament and ran from 16 June until 21 June 1986. First-seeded Martina Navratilova won the singles title, her fifth consecutive at the event and sixth in total.

Finals

Singles
 Martina Navratilova defeated  Helena Suková 3–6, 6–3, 6–4
 It was Navratilova's 6th singles title of the year and the 117th of her career.

Doubles
 Martina Navratilova /  Pam Shriver defeated  Claudia Kohde-Kilsch /  Helena Suková 6–2, 6–4

References

External links
 Official website
 ITF tournament edition details
 Tournament draws

Pilkington Glass Championships
Eastbourne International
Pilkington Glass Championships
Pilkington Glass Championships
1986 in English women's sport